Because He's My Friend, also known as Love Under Pressure, is a 1978 Australian TV movie about a married couple and their mentally disabled son. It was one of six telemovies made in Australia as co-productions between ABC and Transatlantic Enterprises. It was the final film of veteran American director Ralph Nelson.

Plot
Eric, a Canadian naval officer serving with the Royal Navy is transferred to Australia for a submarine training exercise. He moves to Sydney with his wife Anne and their 12-year-old mentally disabled son Petey.

Anne takes her son to a special school, who encourage her to take a firmer line with her son. This results in a clash with Eric.

Cast
 Karen Black as Anne
 Keir Dullea as Eric
 Jack Thompson as Geoff
 Tom Oliver as Ian
Barbara Stephens
June Salter
Warwick Poulsen as Petey

Production
Ralph Nelson signed to direct in July.

Shooting took place in Sydney starting August 15 through to October 1977 over six weeks. Scenes were shot at Karonga House Special School in Epping in August. Permission had been obtained from the Subnormal Children's Welfare Association. The association was happy to co-operate because the activity of the film unit would be good therapy for children.

Jack Thompson filmed his scenes while on a break shooting his role in The Chant of Jimmie Blacksmith.

Reception
The critic from the Sydney Morning Herald said the character of the son was "winning and repulsive at the same time."

Another reviewer for the same paper called it " warm, touching and utterly honest... a darned good movie, and its climax will not disappoint you."

Warwick Poulsen's performance earned him a Logie for Best Performance by a Juvenile.

References

External links

Because He's My Friend at Letterbox DVD
Because He's My Friend at BFI
Because He's My Friend at Screen Australia

Australian drama television films
1978 television films
1978 films
1970s English-language films